Sinuber microstriatum is a species of predatory sea snail, a marine gastropod mollusk in the family Naticidae, the moon snails.

Distribution

Description 
The maximum recorded shell length is 22 mm.

Habitat 
Minimum recorded depth is 230 m. Maximum recorded depth is 230 m.

References

External links

Naticidae
Gastropods described in 1990